Opening Remarks is a 1978 studio album by jazz guitarist Ted Dunbar, recorded for Xanadu Records.

Track listing
"Entrance"
"Two Areas" - 9:08
"Hang In There" - 7:43
"Lazy Lane" - 4:41
"Never Again" - 5:23
"Tonal Search" - 8:06
"Grand Mal - Petit Mal"
"Exit" - 5:42

All music composed by Ted Dunbar.

Personnel 
 Ted Dunbar - guitar
 Tommy Flanagan - piano
 Sam Jones - bass guitar
 Leroy Williams - drums

1978 albums
Ted Dunbar albums
Xanadu Records albums